Kevin Decker is an American football coach and former player who is the offensive coordinator and quarterbacks coach for Old Dominion Monarchs football team.

Playing career
Decker grew up in Armonk, New York and attended the Brunswick School in Greenwich, Connecticut. He went 34-1 in three years as Brunswick's starting quarterback and won three consecutive New England Class C titles. Decker finished his high school career with 5,763 passing yards and 75 touchdown passes.

Decker played college football at the University of New Hampshire. Decker redshirted his true freshman season and was a backup quarterback for his next three seasons for the Wildcats. He was named the starting quarterback going into his redshirt senior season. In his only season as a starter, Decker passed for 3,272 yards and 22 touchdowns while also rushing for 429 yards and nine touchdowns and was named the Colonial Athletic Association Offensive Player of the Year.

Coaching career
Decker began his coaching career at the Brunswick School, where he served as the school's quarterbacks coach and offensive coordinator for two years. He was hired as an assistant to his former New Hampshire offensive coordinator Tim Cramsey at Montana State in 2015 for his collegiate coaching position. Decker was hired by Brown as a tight ends coach after one season at Montana State and was promoted to offensive coordinator in 2018. 

Decker was then hired by Fordham head coach Joe Conlin to serve as the Rams' quarterbacks coach and offensive coordinator in 2019. After the 2020 FCS season was postponed to the spring of 2021 due to the Covid-19 pandemic, Decker studied then-Central Florida head coach Josh Heupel's offense and began installing it leading into the Rams' 2021 season. During the 2022 season, Fordham's offensive became the second team in FCS history to average over 600 yards of total offense per game.

Decker was hired as the offensive coordinator at Old Dominion on December 5, 2022.

References

External links
 New Hampshire Wildcats player bio
 Fordham Rams coaching bio

1988 births
Living people
American football quarterbacks
New Hampshire Wildcats football players
Montana State Bobcats football coaches
Brown Bears football coaches
Fordham Rams football coaches
Players of American football from New York (state)
Coaches of American football from New York (state)
People from Armonk, New York
Brunswick School alumni